Mercan is a village in the Adaklı District, Bingöl Province, Turkey. The village is populated by Kurds and had a population of 195 in 2021.

The hamlets of Ayranlı, Çarıklı, Çomak, İkiz, Kereşan, Kustüyon, Merzon yaylası, Şehit, Taşevler, Yukarımercan and Zabık are attached to the village.

References 

Villages in Adaklı District
Kurdish settlements in Bingöl Province